Han Hye-jin (born March 23, 1983) is a South Korean fashion model and TV personality. She has been on the covers of many fashion magazines, including the May 2008 and June 2009 Korean editions of Vogue.  She walked in the NYFW for 3 years (2006–08).

Career
Han is signed with ESteem Entertainment and works with Marilyn Agency and Why Not.

Spring/Summer 2007
3.1 Philip Lim, 6267, Academy of Art University, Agatha Ruiz de la Prada, Aigner, Andrew Gn, Anteprima, Baby Phat, Barbara Bui, Burberry Prorsum, Cacharel, Carmen Marc Valvo, Celine, Chaiken, Chloe, Cividini, Costello Tagliapietra, Costume National, D&G, DKNY, Diane von Furstenberg, Dice Kayek, Dolce & Gabbana, Gaetano Navarra, Gucci, James Coviello, Joanna Mastroianni, Karen Walker, Karl Lagerfeld, Kenzo, Lacoste, Louis Vuitton, Luca Luca, Malo, Marc Jacobs, Marc by Marc Jacobs, Miss Sixty, Monique Lhuillier, Narciso Rodriguez, Peter Som, Pollini by Rifat Ozbek, Rebecca Taylor, Roberta di Camerino, Roberto Cavalli, Ruffian, Sari Gueron, Sonia Fortuna, Sportmax, Thakoon, Valentino, Vena Cava, Yves Saint Laurent, Rive Gauche, Yigal Azrouel

Fall/Winter 2007
3.1 Phillip Lim, Amuleti J, Anne Klein, Antonio Berardi, BCBG Max Azria, Baby Phat, Bottega Veneta, Bruno Pieters, Burberry Prorsum, Costume National, Carmen Marc Valvo, Celine, Chaiken, Chanel, Charles Nolan, Cher Michel Klein, Chloe, Chris Han, Cividini, Cynthia Steffe, D&G, Daks by Giles Deacon, Dennis Basso, Derercuny, Designers for Darfur, Dice Kayek, Diesel StyleLab, Dolce & Gabbana, Hussein Chalayan, Issey Miyake, Jason Wu, Karl Lagerfeld, Kenzo, Love Sex Money, Luca Luca, Marc Jacobs, Marc by Marc Jacobs, Massimo Rebecchi, Michael Kors, Monique Lhuillier, Moschino, Nanette Lepore, Peter Som, Proenza Schouler, Richard Chai, Rock & Republic, Ruffian, Salvatore Ferragamo, Sari Gueron, Sportmax, Sybilla, Temperley, Thakoon, Tsumori Chisato, Vera Wang, Viktor & Rolf, Yeohlee, Yigal Azrouel, Zac Posen

Personal life
It was revealed that Han was in a relationship with baseball player Cha Woo-chan, who plays for the LG Twins. In November 2017, their respective agencies confirmed their break-up.

On February 27, 2018 it was reported that Han was dating television announcer turned entertainer and host Jun Hyun-moo. The pair have worked together hosting MBC's reality television programme I Live Alone and have emceed the special pilot programme "Romance Package" on SBS. It has since been announced that the couple broke up.

Filmography

Television shows

Web shows

Hosting

Awards and nominations

Listicles

References

South Korean female models
Living people
1983 births